The Garda Air Support Unit (or GASU) is a unit of the Garda Síochána which was formed in 1997. The GASU is part of the Operational Support Unit which provides specialist support to Gardaí nationwide. The Operational Support Unit also includes the Water Support, Dog Support and Mounted Support Units.

Between 2007 and 2008, the unit released figures indicating that it had contributed to 1,300 arrests within the preceding three years, and it had located 14 people during search and rescue operations in 2007.

Aircraft
The GASU's aircraft are maintained and flown by the Irish Air Corps, and based at Casement Aerodrome near Dublin. The unit operates a Britten-Norman BN 2T-4S Defender 4000 aircraft, and two EC 135 T2 helicopters.
A Eurocopter AS355N Squirrel helicopter was in use by the unit until January 2008 when it was replaced by a second EC 135 T2.

Mandate
GASU responsibilities include providing an active support role for the Garda Síochána and aircraft may be deployed to incidents in the following circumstances:

An immediate threat to life.
Incidents of crime, terrorism or of national importance.
Immediate threat of serious public disorder.
A task which will lead to the immediate prevention or detection of crime.
To gather evidence and to prevent or detect crime or to avert a serious public disorder.
To gather information on and deal with incidents relating to crime, public disorder and traffic related matters.
Collecting footage from the air at a major event.

References

External links

Garda Air Support Unit